In enzymology, a sterol 3beta-glucosyltransferase is an enzyme that catalyzes the chemical reaction

UDP-glucose + a sterol  UDP + a sterol 3-beta-D-glucoside

Thus, the two substrates of this enzyme are UDP-glucose and sterol, whereas its two products are UDP and sterol 3-beta-D-glucoside.

This enzyme belongs to the family of glycosyltransferases, specifically the hexosyltransferases.  The systematic name of this enzyme class is UDP-glucose:sterol 3-O-beta-D-glucosyltransferase. Other names in common use include UDPG:sterol glucosyltransferase, UDP-glucose-sterol beta-glucosyltransferase, sterol:UDPG glucosyltransferase, UDPG-SGTase, uridine diphosphoglucose-poriferasterol glucosyltransferase, uridine diphosphoglucose-sterol glucosyltransferase, sterol glucosyltransferase, sterol-beta-D-glucosyltransferase, and UDP-glucose-sterol glucosyltransferase.

References

 
 
 
 
 

EC 2.4.1
Enzymes of unknown structure